Kalyan Kumar Ganguly
(9 January 1926 – 20 September 1997), better known by his stage name Anoop Kumar was an Indian actor who appeared in over sixty-five Bollywood films.

Personal life 

Kalyan was born into a Hindu Bengali family in Khandwa, Central Provinces and Berar (now in Madhya Pradesh). His father Kunjalal Ganguly (Gangopadhya) was a lawyer and his mother Gouri Devi came from a wealthy family. Anoop Kumar was the second-youngest of four siblings, the other three being Ashok Kumar (the eldest), Sati Devi and Kishore Kumar (the youngest).

Career 
Anoop Kumar is best remembered for his role in the movie Chalti Ka Naam Gaadi.

He and his brother Ashok Kumar acted in the 1990 Doordarshan Detective Serial Bheem Bhawani.

Death
Anoop Kumar died on 20 September 1997 following a severe cardiac arrest. He was 71 and is survived by four daughters and a son. Anoop, of Chalti Ka Naam Gaadi fame, was unwell for quite some time. At 04:15 AM on that day, he died of his fourth heart stroke in the Aryogyanidhi hospital, Juhu, North West Bombay, where he was admitted the previous Saturday.
The last rites were performed by his son Arjun on Saturday afternoon at the Juhu crematorium. Amit Kumar, Leena Ganguly and Asha Parekh were among those present. However, 85-year-old Ashok Kumar could not attend the funeral due to illness.

Filmography 

Khiladi (1950) 
Gauna (1950)
Vidyasagar (1950) 
Firdaus (1952) 
Samaj (1953) 
Sajani (1956)
Sheroo (1956) 
Jeevan Saathi (1957)
Dekh Kabira Roya (As Mohan) (1957)
Bandi (1957)
Lukochuri (as Anup Ganguly) (1957)
Chalti Ka Naam Gaadi (As Jagmohan 'Jaggu' Sharma) (1958)
Chacha Zindabad (1958) 
Fashionable Wife (As Natwar) (1959)
Nai Raahen (1959)
Naach Ghar (1959)
Krorepati (As Diwan Himmat Rai) (1959)
Dark Street (1961)
Kismet Palat Ke Dekh (1961)
Junglee (As Jeevan) (1961) 
Jhumroo (As Ramesh) (1961) 
Bezubaan (1961)
Kashmir Ki Kali (As Chander) (1962)
Shreeman Funtoosh (As Ranjan) (1964)
Mahabharat (As Uttara's brother) (1965) 
Bheegi Raat (As Kunwar) (uncredited) (1965) 
Bahu Beti (As Gurudas) (1965)
Raat Aur Din (As Dr. Kumar) (1967) 
Jab Yaad Kisi Ki Aati Hai (1967)
Hum Do Daku (1967) 
Dil Aur Mohabbat (As Anoop) (1967)
Aansoo Ban Gaye Phool (As Shyam Rao) (1968)
Prem Pujari (As Truck driver) (1969)
Amar Prem (1970) 
Victoria No. 203 (As Havaldar Murali) (1972)
Rakhi Aur Hathkadi (As Vikram) (1972)
Anhonee (As Inmate) (1972)
Majboor (Guest Appearance) (1973) 
Nirmaan (1974)
Chori Mera Kaam (As Constable) (1974)
Mutthi Bhar Chawal (1975)
Ek Se Badhkar Ek (1975)
Kitne Paas Kitne Door (1976)
Mrigayaa (1976)
Do Anjaane (1976) (Amit's co-worker)
Proxy (1977)
Chor Ke Ghar Chor (As Police Inspector) (1977)
Chor Ho To Aisa (As Havaldar) (1978)
Anmol Tasveer (1978)
Neeyat (1978)
Tumhare Bina (As Mr. Divakar) (1980)
Chalti Ka Naam Zindagi (1982)
Kaya Palat (1983)
Love Marriage (As Chaurangi) (1983) 
Bhim Bawani (TV Movie) (1984) 
Gayak (1986)
Parivaar (As Dinesh) (1987)
Jawab Hum Denge (As Prosecuting Attorney, Jagmohan) (1987) 
Clerk Mukherjee (1987) 
Mamata Ki Chhaon Mein (1989) 
Bheem Bhavani (TV Series) (1989) 
Maut Ki Sazaa (1990) 
Aasoo Bane Angaarey (1991)
Dushman Zamana (1992)
Rock Dancer  (1993)

Television
 Dada Dadi Ki Kahaniyan
 Ek Raja Ek Rani (1996) as Shopkeeper (Guest Appearance)
 Bheem Bhawani as Bhawani... along with his elder brother Ashok Kumar

References

External links 
 

Indian male film actors
People from Khandwa
Male actors in Hindi cinema
Bengali male actors
1926 births
1997 deaths
20th-century Indian male actors
Male actors from Madhya Pradesh
Bengali Hindus